Al-Jura was a Palestinian village that was depopulated during the 1948 Arab-Israeli war, located approximately two kilometers west of Majdal (both within the boundaries of present-day Ashkelon, Israel). In 1945, the village had a population of approximately 2,420 mostly Muslim inhabitants. Though defended by the Egyptian Army, al-Jura was nevertheless captured by Israel's Givati Brigade in a November 4, 1948, offensive as part of Operation Yoav.

The Shrine of Husayn's Head was located outside the town, until it was destroyed by the Israeli army in 1950.

A 1998 estimate of the population of refugees today who are descendants of those who fled al-Jura, placed the figure at 17,000. The founder and spiritual leader of the Hamas organization Ahmed Yassin was born in al-Jura.

History
Al-Jura (El-Jurah) stood northeast of and immediately adjacent to Tel Ashkelon, the mound of ancient and medieval Ashkelon/Ascalon/ʿAsqalān.

Byzantine ceramics have been found here, together with coins dating to the  seventh century CE.

Ottoman era
In the 1596  Ottoman tax records, Al-Jura was located in the nahiya (subdistrict) of Gaza,  part of Sanjak of Gaza, named Jawrit al-Hajja. It had 46 Muslim households, an estimated  population of 253; who paid a total of 3,400  akçe in taxes.

The Syrian Sufi teacher and traveller Mustafa al-Bakri al-Siddiqi (1688-1748/9) visited Al-Jura in the first half of the eighteenth century, before leaving for Hamama.

In 1863 the French explorer Victor Guérin visited the village, which he called Djoura, and found it to have three hundred inhabitants. He further noted that he could see numerous antiquities, taken from the ruined city, and that the inhabitants of the village grew handsome fruit trees, as well as flowers and vegetables. An Ottoman  village list from about 1870 found that the village had  a population of 340, in a total of  109  houses, though the population count included men, only.

In the late nineteenth century, the village of Al-Jura was situated on flat ground bordering on the ruins of ancient Ascalon. It was rectangular in shape and the residents were Muslim. They had a mosque and a school which was founded in 1919.

British Mandate era
In the 1922 census of Palestine conducted by the British Mandate authorities,  Jura had a population of 1,326 inhabitants, all Muslims, increasing in the 1931 census to 1,754, consisting of 1752 Muslims and 2 Christians, in a total of  396 houses.

In  the 1945 statistics  El Jura  had a population of 2,420 Muslims,  with a total of 12,224  dunams of land, according to an official land and population survey.  Of this, 481 dunams were used  for citrus and bananas, 7,192 for plantations and irrigable land, 2,965  for cereals, while 45 dunams were built-up land.

By the 1940s the  school had  206 students.

1948 War
At the end of November 1948, Coastal Plain District troops carried  out  sweeps of the villages around and to the south of Majdal. Al-Jura was one of the villages named in the orders to the IDF battalions and engineers platoon, that the villagers were to be  expelled to Gaza, and the IDF troops were "to prevent their return by destroying their villages." The path leading to the village was to be mined. The IDF troops were ordered to carry out the operation "with determination, accuracy and energy". The operation took place on 30 November. The troops found "not a living soul" in Al-Jura. However, the destruction of the villages was not completed immediately due to the dampness of the houses and the insufficient amount of explosives.

In 1992, the village site was described: "Only one of the village houses has been spared; thorny plants grow on the parts of the site not built over by Ashqelon."

See also
Depopulated Palestinian locations in Israel

References

Bibliography
 

 
 
 (p146: refer to Stanhope visit 1815, III, 152-169)  25 May

External links
 Al-Jura Town Statistics and Facts
  al-Jura (Gaza),  Zochrot
Survey of Western Palestine, Map 19:   IAA, Wikimedia commons 
 Jura from the Khalil Sakakini Cultural Center

District of Gaza
Arab villages depopulated during the 1948 Arab–Israeli War